The Copa del Café (Coffee Bowl) is an ITF Grade 1 tennis tournament played every January in San José, Costa Rica. The tournament is part of a junior circuit backed by the International Tennis Federation and supported by the tennis federations of many countries.

The tournament was started in 1965 with a group of tennis players at the Costa Rica Country Club. They formed an Organizing Committee, staffed by volunteer club members. Over the years the tournament has become more prestigious and international. The tournament has received strong international support from top players and dedicated coaches, and this has contributed enormously to its success. It is the oldest junior ITF tournament in Latin America and every year the Coffee Bowl receives entries from more than 40 countries. The tournament has televised night play every day, and averages over 3,000 spectators each day.

Singles champions

References

External links
 ITF Tennis - Juniors - Tournament Overview
 Copa del Cafe - Official Tournament Site

Tennis in Costa Rica